Shivpuri railway station is a main railway station in Shivpuri district, Madhya Pradesh. Its code is SVPI. It serves Shivpuri city. The station consists of two platforms, neither well sheltered. It lacks many facilities including water and sanitation.

Shivpuri is well connected to all parts of the country including Guna, Delhi, Mumbai, Bhind, Pune, Dehradun, Gwalior, Indore, Ujjain, Kota, Chandigarh and other major cities.

References

Railway stations in Shivpuri district
Bhopal railway division
Shivpuri